Bengt Mikael Stanne (born 20 May 1974) is a Swedish musician, best known as the vocalist and one of the lyricists (as well as a former rhythm guitarist) for the Swedish melodic death metal band Dark Tranquillity. Since the departure of original drummer Anders Jivarp in 2021, Stanne is the only remaining original member of the band. Stanne is also the vocalist for bands Grand Cadaver and The Halo Effect, which formed in 2020 and 2021 respectively. He was also an ex-vocalist for Swedish bands HammerFall and In Flames.

Background

Dark Tranquillity
Stanne, along with Niklas Sundin, formed Dark Tranquillity because they were bored, along with interest in metal from their influences. He played guitar and performed clean backing vocals on Dark Tranquillity's first album, Skydancer, as well as on their early demos, including Enfeebled Earth released under the name Septic Broiler. In 1994, Anders Fridén, Dark Tranquillity's original vocalist, left the band to join In Flames. Stanne then became the new vocalist and discontinued playing guitar.

In addition to his usual growling vocals, Dark Tranquillity's 1999 album, Projector, showcased his operatic "clean" singing abilities. After Projector, however, the clean style was mostly abandoned until the release of Fiction in 2007.

Other projects
Stanne is the vocalist for death metal band Grand Cadaver, which formed in 2020.

Stanne was the original vocalist for HammerFall from 1993 until 1996, after which he was replaced because he couldn't perform with HammerFall due to his commitment to Dark Tranquillity.

Guest appearances
 Stanne was a session vocalist for the Swedish melodic death metal band In Flames during their early career. He provided the lead vocals for In Flames' debut album Lunar Strain in 1993. However, Stanne never became an official member of In Flames; he did the session vocals as a "favour” for In Flames, who did not have a vocalist at the time.
 In 2005, Stanne provided a clean vocal passage on the Nightrage song "Frozen", alongside At the Gates vocalist Tomas Lindberg, on their album Descent into Chaos.
 In 2008, Stanne performed guest vocals in the band Scar of the Sun, for a track named “Ode to a Failure”.
 In 2010 Stanne guested on Solution .45's debut album by contributing the lyrics for most of the tracks and providing vocals on the tracks "Bladed Vaults" and "On Embered Fields Adust."
 In 2010, Stanne provided vocals in the song “Weather the Storm” by Insomnium.
 In 2010, Nightrage released the song “Gallant Deeds”, an unreleased track recorded by Stanne from the Descent into Chaos sessions. It is now available on the Nightrage re-issue Vengeance Descending.
 In 2011, Stanne appeared on the track “Wastelands Within” by Mourning Caress, for their album Deep Wounds, Bright Scars.
 In 2012, Stanne appeared on the track “Skin Changer” by Helcaraxë for their album Red Dragon.
 In 2015, Stanne appeared on several tracks in the album The Great Lie by Melted Space.
In 2018, Stanne provided vocals for the album Darkening Light by Melted Space.
In 2020, Stanne appeared on the track "Whispers from the Wicked" by Carthagods, on their album The Monster In Me.
In 2020, Stanne provided additional vocals on the track "A Meditation Upon Death" by Nonexist, from their album Like the Fearless Hunter.
 In 2022, Stanne acted as a guest vocalist for six tracks for the video game Metal: Hellsinger.

References

External links
 Metal Israel interview

Male guitarists
Swedish heavy metal singers
English-language singers from Sweden
Living people
1974 births
People from Gothenburg
Swedish male singers
Dark Tranquillity members
HammerFall members
In Flames members